Sabastian Kimaru Sawe (born 16 March 1996) is a Kenyan long-distance runner, who competes in cross country and road racing. He finished 7th at the 2023 World Cross Country Championships and was a part of Kenya's team gold medal. He also holds a half marathon best of 58:58 from his win at the Bahrain Royal Night Half Marathon. In 2022, he set the Kenyan national record for the one hour run at Memorial Van Damme with a distance of 21,250 m, narrowly missing the world record. He also set the course record at the Rome-Ostia Half Marathon in a time of 58:02 (a non-record eligible course).

References

External links 
 

Living people
1996 births
Kenyan male long-distance runners